In canon law, a canonical act is a document which prove an ecclesiastical procedure.

References

Catholic canonical documents